Karl W. Turner (born March 23, 1942) is an American politician and businessperson from Maine. Turner served as a Republican State Senator from Maine's 11th District, representing part of Cumberland County, including the population centers of Falmouth and his residence in Cumberland. He served from 2000 to 2008, when he was replaced by fellow Republican Gerald Davis.

Turner served on the town council of Falmouth, Maine from 1985 to 1991. On August 8, 2011, Turner was appointed as trustee of the University of Maine System.

Personal
Turner was born on March 23, 1942, in Eastport, Maine. He graduated from the University of Maine with a Bachelor of Science in mechanical engineering in 1965.

References

1942 births
Living people
Maine city council members
Republican Party Maine state senators
People from Eastport, Maine
People from Falmouth, Maine
People from Cumberland, Maine
University of Maine alumni
University of Maine people
21st-century American politicians